Purari (Namau) is a Papuan language of Papua New Guinea.

Names
Purari is also known as Koriki, Evorra, I'ai, Maipua, and Namau.  "Namau" is a colonial term which means "deaf (lit.), inattentive, or stupid (Williams 1924: 4)."  Today people of the Purari Delta find this term very offensive.  F.E. Williams   reports that the "[a]n interpreter suggests that by some misunderstanding the name had its origin in the despair of an early missionary, who, finding the natives turned a deaf ear to his teaching, dubbed them all 'Namau'." (Williams 1924: 4).  Koriki, I'ai, and Maipua refer to self-defining groups that make up the six groups that today compose the people who speak Purari.  Along with the Baroi (formerly known as the Evorra, which was the name of a village site), Kaimari and the Vaimuru, these groups speak mutually intelligible dialects of Purari.

The name Baimuru (after Baimuru Rural LLG) is given in Petterson (2019).

Literature
Some literature exists in Purari, mainly Scripture portions produced by missionaries and Bible agencies.  The first items in the language were a primer and hymnal published for the London Missionary Society in 1902.  Later a New Testament, called 'Ene amua Iesu Keriso onu kuruei voa Nawawrea Eire', was published by the British and Foreign Bible Society in 1920, which was republished in 1947.

Classification
Noting that the few similarities with the Eleman languages may be because of loanwords, Pawley and Hammarström (2018) leave it as unclassified rather than as part of Trans-New Guinea.

Pronouns
Pronouns are 1sg nai, 2sg ni, 1pl enei.  The first may resemble Trans–New Guinea *na, but Purari appears to be related to the Binanderean–Goilalan languages.

Phonology
Unlike most other neighboring Papuan languages, Purari (Baimuru) is non-tonal.

Vocabulary
The following basic vocabulary words are from Franklin (1973), as cited in the Trans-New Guinea database:

{| class="wikitable sortable"
! gloss !! Purari
|-
| head || uku
|-
| hair || kimari
|-
| ear || keporo
|-
| eye || inamu
|-
| nose || pina
|-
| tooth || niʔiri
|-
| tongue || anae
|-
| leg || ari
|-
| louse || kaeriʔi
|-
| dog || oroko
|-
| bird || nako
|-
| egg || munu
|-
| blood || aro
|-
| bone || laʔaro
|-
| skin || kape
|-
| breast || ame
|-
| tree || iri
|-
| man || vake
|-
| woman || aʔe
|-
| sun || lare
|-
| moon || ia
|-
| water || ere
|-
| fire || iau
|-
| stone || rore
|-
| name || noe
|-
| eat || navai
|-
| one || monou
|-
| two || leʔeo
|}

References

Further reading 

Kairi, T. and John Kolia. 1977. Purari language notes. Oral History 5(10): 1–90.

External links 

TransNewGuinea.org database
Materials on Karnai are included in the open access Arthur Capell collections (AC1 and AC2) held by Paradisec
 Paradisec has an open access collection from Tom Dutton (TD1) that includes Purari language materials

Binanderean–Goilalan languages
Languages of Gulf Province